The prose style of J. R. R. Tolkien's Middle-earth books, especially The Lord of the Rings, is remarkably varied. Commentators have noted that Tolkien selected linguistic registers to suit different peoples, such as simple and modern for Hobbits and more archaic for Dwarves, Elves, and Riders of Rohan. This allowed him to use the Hobbits to mediate between the modern reader and the heroic and archaic realm of fantasy. The Orcs, too, are depicted in different voices: the Orc-leader Grishnákh speaks in bullying tones, while the minor functionary Gorbag uses grumbling modern speech.

Tolkien's prose style was attacked by scholars of literature such as Catharine R. Stimpson and Burton Raffel in the 20th century. It has more recently been analysed more favourably, both by other novelists such as Ursula Le Guin, and by scholars such as Brian Rosebury and Tom Shippey. Where Stimpson called Tolkien's diction needlessly complex, Rosebury argues that even in the example she chose, Tolkien was as plain and simple as Ernest Hemingway. He analyses a passage where Merry has just helped to kill the Witch-King. Tolkien begins this in plain language, modulating into a higher register to deal with the echoes of ancient and magical history.

Syntax and diction

Plain as Hemingway 

In his lifetime, J. R. R. Tolkien's fantasy writing, especially The Lord of the Rings, became extremely popular with the public, but was rejected by literary critics, partly on stylistic grounds. For example, Catharine R. Stimpson, a scholar of English, wrote in 1969 that Tolkien not only "shun[s] ordinary diction, he also wrenches syntax". She supported her argument by inventing what she asserted were Tolkienistic sentences such as "To an eyot he came." On the other hand, Burton Raffel, a Beowulf translator, asserted in 1968 that Tolkien wrote so simply, without the sorts of effect to be expected in a novel, that it did not constitute proper literature, though it worked as adventure story. In 1978, Michael Moorcock, in his essay Epic Pooh, criticized Tolkien for utilizing a comforting and unchallenging writing style reflective of a "conservative misanthropism", and in 2001, The New York Times reviewer Judith Shulevitz criticized his style’s "pedantry", saying that he "formulated a high-minded belief in the importance of his mission as a literary preservationist, which turns out to be death to literature itself."

The scholar of humanities Brian Rosebury systematically replies to each item in Stimpson's attack, showing that Tolkien mostly uses plain modern English. He locates the three places where Tolkien uses "eyot", arguing that "island" could not in these instances be used instead without loss of meaning. In "Still there are dangerous places even before we come there: rocks and stony eyots in the stream", "islands" is possible, he writes, but "'eyot' more firmly suggests something small enough to be overlooked until one runs aground". All three, Rosebury writes, are unexceptional in 20th century syntax: "Ernest Hemingway could have written them".

Justified grandeur 

Rosebury studies several examples of Tolkien's diction in The Lord of the Rings at length, citing passages and analysing them in detail to show what they achieve. One is the moment when the Hobbit Merry has helped to kill the Witch-King, the leader of the Ringwraiths, and finds himself standing alone on the battlefield. Part of the quoted passage runs:

Rosebury writes that this begins with "essentially plain syntax", as if Merry were speaking; but "woven into the clauses" are subtle clues in the syntax, like "heed" rather than "notice", and the Hobbit's full name Meriadoc to stay in touch with the un-Hobbitlike "heroic tonality" of the passage. The first sentence of the second paragraph, he notes, heralds a shift of mood, as does the following "But glad would he have been", with effective use of inversion. Rosebury shows how awkward the uninverted form would have been: "But he who wrought it long ago ... would have been glad to know its fate." The passage ends with a powerfully musical sentence with assonances between "blade", "wield", "dealt" and so on; alliteration with "wield", "wound", "will"; memorable phrases like "unseen sinews"; and the immediacy of the present participles "cleaving...breaking", the implied "and" importantly suppressed. Rosebury states that the wide range of styles could have become an untidy mess, but the narrative is big enough to allow Tolkien to modulate gracefully between low and high styles.

Simple but varied 

In 2001, the fantasy novelist Ursula Le Guin wrote a sympathetic account of Tolkien's prose style, arguing as Michael Drout writes that "the craftsmanship of The Lord of the Rings is consistent at all levels of construction, from the individual sentence to the macro structure of the journey, a repeated stress and release pattern". Allan Turner called Le Guin's contribution an "insightful though rather impressionistic appraisal"; he demonstrated with examples that Tolkien's style is both generally simple, using parataxis – sentences without subordinate clauses or causal conjunctions – and varied, adapted to the race and standing of the speaker, and using special stylistic effects at key moments in the story. 

Turner describes how Tolkien varies his style for the second eucatastrophe in the Battle of the Pelennor Fields. At the moment when the horsemen of Rohan are beginning to tire, and the battle is hanging in the balance, their leader, Éomer, realises that he is looking not at the disastrous arrival of an enemy fleet of the Corsairs of Umbar, but at the unlooked-for arrival of Aragorn and Men of southern Gondor in captured ships: 

Turner notes that the paratactic style here, with the repeated use of "and" in the manner of the New Testament, is "stylistically marked", indicating something out of the ordinary. Shippey calls such deliberate use of the conjunction, avoiding explicit logical connection, "loose semantic fit". Turner writes that readers experience the shift in style as "an impression of exalted register" because of the biblical association, even though Tolkien uses few unusual or archaic words in the passage.

Characterisation by style 

From the 1990s onwards, novelists and scholars began to adopt a more favourable view of Tolkien's place in literature. The 2014 A Companion to J. R. R. Tolkien in particular marked Tolkien's acceptance in the literary canon, with essays by major Tolkien scholars on style and many other aspects of his writing.

Hobbits as mediators with the heroic 

The J. R. R. Tolkien Encyclopedia states that The Lord of the Rings makes use of several styles of prose, with discrete linguistic registers for different characters, peoples, and cultures. In its view, Tolkien intentionally creates a contrast between the simple modern style of the Hobbits and more archaizing language for the Dwarves, Elves, and Riders of Rohan. Further, the genre of the work begins with novelistic realism in the Shire, where the down-to-earth Hobbits live, climbing to high romance for the defeat of the Dark Lord Sauron, and descending to realism again for the return to the Shire. Further, it states, Tolkien avoids the expression of modern concepts when describing pre-modern cultures.

Tolkien stated that he intentionally changed the speaking style of certain individual characters to suit their interactions with other characters, mentioning that "the more learned and able among the Hobbits", including Frodo, were "quick to note and adopt the style of those whom they met". The philologist and Tolkien scholar Tom Shippey explains that the Hobbits serve as mediators between the ordinary modern world and the heroic and archaic fantasy realm, making The Hobbit and The Lord of the Rings readily accessible. Such mediation is effected early in The Lord of the Rings by having the Hobbits effectively present the archaic characters in their own way, as when Pippin "attempts a formal register" with the words "O Wise People!" on meeting the High Elf Gildor in the woods of the Shire.

Ancient clashing with modern 

Shippey analyses some of the cultures that clash in the Council of Elrond. The Wizard Gandalf reports on what he heard from Gaffer Gamgee, a simple old Hobbit in the Shire: "'I can't abide changes', said he, 'not at my time of life, and least of all changes for the worst'". Shippey writes that his proverb-rich language speaks of psychological unpreparedness, and a sort of baseline of normality. Gaffer Gamgee's son Sam speaks slightly better in Shippey's view, with his "A nice pickle we have landed ourselves in, Mr Frodo", as he is refusing to see Mordor as anything bigger than "a pickle", the "Anglo-hobbitic inability to know when they're beaten". Gandalf then introduces the traitorous Wizard Saruman, his slipperiness "conveyed by style and lexis": 

Shippey comments that no other character in the book uses words so empty of meaning as "real", "deploring", and "ultimate", and that Saruman's speech contains several modern evils – betraying allies, preferring ends to means, W. H. Auden's "conscious acceptance of guilt in the necessary murder". Rosebury comments that Saruman has a "convincingly" wide repertoire of speaking styles: "colloquial, diplomatic, intimidatory, vituperative". In his view, Gandalf has both a broad range of diction and powerful rhetoric; he is able to deploy warm humour as well as irony; and he narrates, explains, and argues effectively. Given "his nomadic life, linguistic skill and far-reaching intelligence", he can vary his speaking style as widely as Tolkien's narrative, from relaxed Hobbit conversation to "exalted narration". Rosebury cites Elizabeth Kirk's remark that Tolkien uses each style not mainly to "define the individuality of the given speaker or situation, but to enact the kind of consciousness he shares with others who have a comparable stance before experience", but he suggests instead that often there is simply a "Common Speech" shared by Men, Elves, and Dwarves with not much to differentiate them.

In comparison to these modern voices, Tolkien makes the other Council members speak in an "archaic, blunt, clearsighted" way. The leading Elf, Elrond, uses antique words like "esquire", "shards" (of a sword), and "weregild", along with "old-fashioned inversions of syntax", remarking for instance "Now, therefore, things shall be openly spoken that have been hidden from all but a few until this day". Other voices too are distinctively old: the Dwarf Glóin strikes a "heroic note" with his report of the Dwarf-King Dáin's defiant response to Sauron's messenger, who asks for news of a lost ring, and says that if Dáin does not do as he asks

Shippey notes that the messenger's polite "things will not seem so well" comes over as a dire threat, while Dáin's "fair cloak" evidently means "foul body". The effect is to convey the Dwarves' "unyielding scepticism" in the face of danger. He concludes that most of the information given in the chapter is carried not by narrative but by linguistic mode: "Language variation gives Tolkien a thorough and economical way of dramatising ethical debate."

Varied dialogue types for the enemy 

Rosebury writes that whereas some critics have asserted that the monstrous Orcs are represented as "working class", Tolkien had in fact created at least three types of Orc-dialogue for different ranks and tribes within their "closed militarist culture of hatred and cruelty"; and none of these is working class. He describes the Mordor Orc-leader Grishnákh as "comparatively cerebral", speaking "like a melodrama villain, or a public-school bully". Merry and Pippin are told:

Anna Vaninskaya writes that the most modern idiom in The Lord of the Rings is used by the Orcs overheard by Frodo and Sam in Mordor. Tolkien gives them the speech of the twentieth century, whether as soldiers, functionaries in party or government, or "minor officials in a murderous bureaucracy". Gorbag says:

She writes that Tolkien captures, too, "the clipped language of army dispatches":

Also quite modern, she writes, is frustration with whatever headquarters is up to:

Distinctive individuality 

Rosebury however considers that Tolkien's "most memorable success" of voice is the monster Gollum's "extraordinary idiolect", with its obsessive repetition, its infantile whining, its minimal syntax and its unstable sense of being one or two people, hinting at mental illness; "Gollum's moral deformity is like that of an unregenerate child grown old, in whom the unattractive infant qualities of selfishness, cruelty and self-pitying dependency are monstrously preserved and isolated."

Visual imagination 

Rosebury writes that the "distinctive best" style in The Lord of the Rings is seen neither in dialogue nor in moments of action, but in "narrative that is at once dynamic and sensuously alert". He selects a passage from The Two Towers, stating that Tolkien's visual imagination here is "at its sharpest", and that he characteristically takes a static vantage point (in Ithilien), building up a panorama from there:

The Silmarillion 

The Silmarillion, by contrast, is written in a compressed style, in which events are briefly documented as if in annals recording history and legend, rather than described with much focus on persons or the niceties of conventional storytelling. 
Shippey states that The Silmarillion comes across to the reader as a more distant and mythic work than The Lord of the Rings; there was in his view no place for humorously earthy Hobbits in the "more rarefied air" of that work.
Many chapters have little in the way of dialogue, though "Of Túrin Turambar" is an exception. The cheerful informality of the Hobbits is lacking, making the work feel more difficult.

Tolkien wrote elements of his legendarium, The Silmarillion sensu lato, throughout his life, and they vary substantially in style. The journalist Nicholas Lezard comments, for instance, that The Children of Húrins prose style "is far from that breezy, homely donnishness that characterises The Hobbit and the first book of The Lord of the Rings". In his view, it starts "almost impenetrably" with "'Haldor Goldenhead was a lord of the Edain and well-beloved by the Eldar. He dwelt while his days lasted under the lordship of Fingolfin, who gave to him wide lands in that region of Hithlum which was called Dor-lómin.' To which the unfamiliar reader may well ask: who? The who? The who? Who? And where?" He grants, however, that the work "does have a strange atmosphere all of its own".

Shakespearean influence 

Michael Drout argues that the section of The Return of the King in which war comes to the land of Gondor, and its kingship comes into question, has a series of literary connections with Shakespeare's King Lear. 

 First, the hobbit Merry and the noblewoman Éowyn fight the Lord of the Nazgûl. The Nazgûl says "Come not between the Nazgûl and his prey", as the mad Lear says "Come not between the dragon and his wrath".  
 Further, the Steward of Gondor, Denethor calls his servants to help him burn himself and his heir Faramir to death with the words "Come if you are not all recreant!", where Lear calls Kent "recreant" for criticising Lear's handling of Cordelia; Drout notes that Tolkien uses the word only this once.  
 Éomer, seeing Éowyn apparently lifeless on the ground, is enraged: "'Éowyn, Éowyn!' he cried at last: 'Éowyn, how come you here? What madness or devilry is this? Death, death, death! Death take us all!'" while Lear rages "And my poor fool is hanged! No, no, no life? / Why should a dog, a horse, a rat have life, / And thou no breath at all? Thou'lt come no more / Never, never, never, never, never!" Drout comments that the passages share similar repetitions to express similar situations: loss of a female relative and madness.  
 Then, Imrahil proves Éowyn is alive by holding "the bright-burnished vambrace that was upon his arm before her cold lips, and behold! a little mist was laid on it hardly to be seen", while Lear says "Lend me a looking glass; / If that her breath will mist or stain the stone, / Why, then she lives".  
 Finally, Lears fool speaks of "seven stars"; Gandalf of "Seven stars and seven stones / And one white tree". 

Drout comments that while some of these comparisons are in themselves inconclusive, the overall pattern is strongly suggestive. He adds that Tolkien's professed dislike of Shakespeare is well-known, he was certainly influenced by Macbeth and A Midsummer Night's Dream, and his use of King Lear for "issues of kingship, madness, and succession" is hardly surprising.

References

Primary

Secondary

Sources

 
 
 
 
 
 
 
 
 
 
 
 
 
 
 

J. R. R. Tolkien
Middle-earth